Melchizedek is a Biblical figure of significance in both Judaic and Christian traditions.

Melchizedek may also refer to:

Religion
 Priesthood of Melchizedek, the continuum of Malkizedek's priesthood in various religions
 Exaltation of Melchizedek, for the references in Second Book of Enoch
 Melchisedechians, for an early Christian heresy
 Melchizedek priesthood (Latter Day Saints), for LDS significance
 Melchizedek (text), a Gnostic text

People
 Melchizedek I of Georgia (fl. 1010–1033), the first Catholicos-Patriarch of All Georgia
 Melchizedek II of Georgia (fl. 1528–1553)
 Melchizedek III of Georgia (1872–1960)
 Melchisedec Ștefănescu (1823, 1892), Romanian bishop and historian
 Melchisédech Thévenot (ca. 1620-1692), French author, scientist, traveler, cartographer, orientalist, inventor, and diplomat
 Melquisedet Angulo Córdova (fl. 2009), member of the Mexican Navy's special forces
 Melky Sedeck, R&B hip hop duo

Fictional characters
 Melchizedek, a rich Jew in Boccaccio's The Decameron, Day 1, Novel 3
 Melchizedek, a character in The Alchemist by Paulo Coelho
 Melchizedek, the main brain of Salem in the Battle Angel Alita graphic novel series

Other uses
 Melchizedek, a 30-litre wine bottle, often used for champagne
 The Dominion of Melchizedek, a micronation known largely for allegedly facilitating large scale banking fraud